Otto Dimroth (28 March 1872 – 16 May 1940) was a German chemist. He is known for the Dimroth rearrangement, as well as a type of condenser with an internal double spiral, the Dimroth condenser.

His son Karl Dimroth was also a renowned chemist, who described the first synthesis of 3-benzoxepin.

References

Academic staff of the University of Greifswald
1872 births
1940 deaths